EurekaBank was a Foster City, California, based bank, with primary operations in the San Francisco Bay Area. Formerly known as Eureka Federal Savings and Loan, based out of San Carlos, California, and known for a scandal in the 1980s involving John DeLorean (maker of the car made famous by the movie Back to the Future). The bank  operated 36 branches in the region, and was one of the largest local banks. Its overall existence was short, as it was acquired by Bay View Bank in 1998, less than ten years after it was founded as a replacement to the failed Eureka Federal Savings.

References

External links

Defunct banks of the United States
Banks established in 1988
1988 establishments in California
Companies based in Foster City, California
Banks disestablished in 1997
1997 disestablishments in California
U.S. Bancorp